The Interstate Highways in Minnesota are all owned and operated by the US State of Minnesota.  The Minnesota Department of Transportation (MnDOT) provides primary maintenance for all 921.621 miles of highway.  There are no tolled miles on the Minnesota Interstate, with the exception of HOV lanes governed by the MnPASS program.  The system is made up of three primary routes, four auxiliary sections, including two spurs and two loop sections, as well as one of three split sections remaining in the United States, I-35E and I-35W.

Primary Interstate Highways

Auxiliary Interstate Highways

Business Interstate Highways

See also

References

External links

 MnDOT Roadway Data
 The Unofficial Minnesota Highways Page, by Steve Riner
 Twin Cities Highways, by Adam Froehlig

 
Interstate Highways

es:Anexo:Carreteras estatales de Minnesota#Interestatales